EFD was an American payments services company. It provided financial service companies and other large enterprises with new account decisions, fraud detection and payment processing services.  On June 27, 2007, Fidelity National Information Services, Inc. (FIS) announced that it was acquiring EFD in an all-cash transaction valued at about $1.8B. The target completion date for the acquisition was the 3rd quarter of 2007.

Company history
EFD was formed as eFunds Corporation in 1999 as a spin-off from Deluxe Corporation, bringing together established players in financial risk management and electronic transaction processing services; previously distinct businesses within Deluxe.

In January 2000, iDLX Technology Partners, another Deluxe unit, combined with eFunds to add professional services and business process outsourcing capabilities to the new business. In June 2000, eFunds held its initial public offering on the NASDAQ national market and later that year completed its separation from Deluxe.

In March 2007, eFunds Corporation announced its transition to its new corporate brand, EFD.

EFD | eFunds International
Based primarily in the US, EFD|eFunds International Limited extends EFD's services beyond North America. In India, eFunds employs more than 5,000 employees in its Software Development, BPO and IT services operations in Mumbai, Gurgaon and Chennai. The company has been ranked among the top three BPO providers in the country.

See also
 ChexSystems

References

External links
 eFunds Corporation
 Fidelity National Information Services
 FIS Global

FIS (company)
Financial services companies established in 1999
Payment service providers
Companies based in Scottsdale, Arizona
2007 mergers and acquisitions
1999 establishments in Minnesota